The  is a Japanese Domestic Grade 1 flat horse race in Japan for three-year-old thoroughbred colts and fillies run over a distance of 2,000 metres (approximately 1 mile 2 furlongs) at the Oi Racecourse, Shinagawa, Tokyo in late July.

It was first run in 1999 and is the Japanese equivalent of the American Kentucky Derby.
But this race is the last leg of triple crown of minami-kanto keiba (nankan keiba), while Kentucky Derby is the first one of American triple crown races.

The majority of winners comes from the Japan Racing Association (JRA), another Japan horse racing governing body. As JRA do not host any dirt Grade 1 race exclusively for 3-year-old horses. It is also the only 3-year-old Grade 1 race in Japan that Geldings can enter.

Announced last June 20, 2022, in 2024, it will become the third leg of the Japanese Triple Crown of Dirt along with Haneda Hai and Tokyo Derby. The name of the race may be changed as well as the schedule will be moved to October. Geldings will no longer be able to enter and prize money for 1st place will be increased to ¥ 70,000,000.

Winners since 1999

References

Flat horse races for three-year-olds
Horse races in Japan
Dirt races in Japan